is a Japanese professional sumo wrestler. He completes in the makuuchi division. The highest rank he has reached is sekiwake.

Early life and sumo background
From the third grade of elementary school, Sugiyama began practicing at a sumo dōjō near his home and began participating in national amateur sumo tournaments in junior high school. This exposure soon had him being scouted by several sumo stables. He chose to first finish high school and went on to university. He graduated from Kinki University in Osaka.

Career

Upon his graduation, the former yokozuna Asahifuji, who had previously attended the same high school and university as Sugiyama, invited him to join Isegahama stable of which Asahifuji was head coach. Sugiyama's professional sumo career began in January 2009. He took the shikona of Takarafuji from the beginning, following the practice at Isegahama of wrestlers taking a ring name at the beginning rather than waiting for a promotion opportunity as most stables do. He advanced quickly through the lower ranks. He narrowly lost the jonokuchi championship in his debut, losing in a playoff. He then posted an impressive 6-1 in his jonidan division debut in the next tournament. In the following July 2009 tournament, he won the sandanme division championship with a perfect record and a playoff win. His progress slowed only slightly on entering the tougher makushita division. Through to July 2010 he posted only one losing tournament, and was promoted to the jūryō second division in September 2010. His promotion from makushita 2 to jūryō 12 was higher than normal due to seven other wrestlers being suspended for gambling on baseball. Regardless of being put at a higher rank than his record had yet warranted, he excelled, posting four consecutive winning records and advancing to the top-tier makuuchi division in July 2011 at maegashira 10.  

His debut in the division would turn out to be the same tournament that his stablemate, ōzeki Harumafuji would win the championship.  This auspicious debut did little for his record, and an unimpressive 4–11 record had him demoted. For four tournaments, he alternated between losing records in makuuchi that bounced him down to jūryō where he would post an impressive enough record to achieve top-tier promotion again. Though he only posted a 6–9 record at maegashira 14 in the March 2012 tournament, unimpressive performances by many wrestlers in nearby ranks allowed him to stay in the makuuchi division at the bottom maegashira 16 rank for the May 2012 tournament.  In this tournament he would finally post his first winning record, being in the championship race until late in the tournament before several consecutive losses knocked him out of the running.  Since this time, he has been a managed to stay in the top division for the better part of three years, posting roughly alternating winning and losing tournaments, and was only demoted to jūryō once in November 2012 before bouncing right back into the top division. 

He earned his first kinboshi or gold star for defeating yokozuna Kakuryū in the January 2015 tournament, but he missed out on a first special prize and promotion to the san'yaku ranks after he failed to win on the final day and ended with a make-koshi 7–8 record. Winning records in March and May saw him promoted to komusubi for the first time but a 4–11 result in July saw him return to the rank and file. He managed only four wins in September but returned to form with ten wins in November and a winning record in January 2016 led to him being made komusubi again for the March tournament. In this tournament he defeated Hakuhō on the opening day, his first win over the yokozuna in eleven attempts. He beat Hakuhō again on the 5th day of the July tournament in Nagoya, ending the yokozuna'''s 33 bout winning streak. He ended the tournament with a 10–5 record and was awarded the special prize for Fighting Spirit. He was promoted to his highest rank to date of sekiwake for the following September 2016 tournament, but could only score 4–11 and was demoted. He has remained in the maegashira ranks since then.

Fighting style
Takarafuji is a yotsu–sumo wrestler who prefers a hidari–yotsu, or right hand outside and left hand inside grip on his opponent's mawashi. His most common winning kimarite are the two most popular techniques in sumo, yorikiri or force out, and oshidashi'' or push out.

Personal
On his promotion to the top division, his passing resemblance to the celebrity Matsuko Deluxe was noted by the Japanese media.

He announced his marriage to a 24-year-old former dental assistant in December 2017, which had been registered in September.

Career record

See also
List of sumo tournament top division runners-up
List of active gold star earners
Glossary of sumo terms
List of active sumo wrestlers
List of sekiwake
Active special prize winners

References

External links
 

1987 births
Living people
Japanese sumo wrestlers
Sumo people from Aomori Prefecture
Sekiwake